Scopula inflexibilis is a moth of the  family Geometridae. It is found on the Andamans.

References

Moths described in 1931
inflexibilis
Moths of Asia